Jena Umar Mohamed (born 24 December 1995) is a male Ethiopian middle-distance runner competing primarily in the 800 metres. He represented his country at the 2015 World Championships in Beijing reaching the semifinals.

His personal bests in the event are 1:46.07 outdoors (Montbéliard 2015) and 1:49.06 indoors (Mondeville 2015).

Competition record

References

1995 births
Living people
Ethiopian male middle-distance runners
Place of birth missing (living people)
World Athletics Championships athletes for Ethiopia
21st-century Ethiopian people